Alfredo Bercht (2 January 1922 – 2005) was a Brazilian sailor. He competed at the 1952 Summer Olympics and the 1956 Summer Olympics.

He was 1956 Brazilian National champion in the Snipe class.

References

External links
 

1922 births
2005 deaths
Brazilian male sailors (sport)
Olympic sailors of Brazil
Sailors at the 1952 Summer Olympics – Finn
Sailors at the 1956 Summer Olympics – 12 m2 Sharpie
Sportspeople from Porto Alegre
Snipe class sailors